Ingo Kindervater (born 1 January 1979) is a retired badminton player from Germany and now the Head of Performance for Badminton Scotland.

Career
Ingo was the men's doubles bronze medallist at the 2008 European Championships partnered with Kristof Hopp, and in 2010 with Michael Fuchs.

In 2012, he qualified for the London Olympics with Johannes Schöttler after gaining 43529.339 points during the qualifying period and reaching 18th in the BWF World Ranking. On 23 July the draw was conducted and Kindervater and Schöttler were placed in Group A alongside Cai Yun/Fu Haifeng, Fang Chieh Min/Lee Sheng Mu, and Ross Smith/Glenn Warfe.

He won the 2012 Bitburger Open in the men's doubles with his partner Johannes Schöttler after beating Chris Langridge and Peter Mills 21–15, 21–11.

After retiring in 2013, Kindervater finished his diploma in Economics before becoming National Doubles Coach for the German Badminton Association. Kindervater supported the German Badminton Olympic Team as a coach in the Rio 2016 Olympics.

After 6 years in this position, Ingo relocated to Edinburgh, Scotland, where he took the post of Head of Performance with Badminton Scotland.

Achievements

European Championships
Men's doubles

BWF Superseries 
The BWF Superseries, launched on 14 December 2006 and implemented in 2007, is a series of elite badminton tournaments, sanctioned by Badminton World Federation (BWF). BWF Superseries has two level such as Superseries and Superseries Premier. A season of Superseries features twelve tournaments around the world, which introduced since 2011, with successful players invited to the Superseries Finals held at the year end.

Men's doubles

 BWF Superseries Finals tournament
 BWF Superseries Premier tournament
 BWF Superseries tournament

BWF Grand Prix
The BWF Grand Prix has two levels: Grand Prix and Grand Prix Gold. It is a series of badminton tournaments, sanctioned by Badminton World Federation (BWF) since 2007. The World Badminton Grand Prix sanctioned by International Badminton Federation (IBF) since 1983.

Men's doubles

Mixed doubles

 BWF Grand Prix Gold tournament
 BWF & IBF Grand Prix tournament

BWF International Challenge/Series
Men's doubles

Mixed doubles

 BWF International Challenge tournament
 BWF International Series tournament

References

External links
 
 
 
 
 

Living people
1979 births
People from Burgwedel
German male badminton players
Olympic badminton players of Germany
Badminton players at the 2012 Summer Olympics
Sportspeople from Lower Saxony